Hilario Hipólito Veret (born 14 January 1952) is a Cuban fencer. He competed in the team sabre event at the 1972 Summer Olympics.

References

External links
 
 Profile at florida.gob.cu

1952 births
Living people
Cuban male fencers
Olympic fencers of Cuba
Fencers at the 1972 Summer Olympics
Fencers at the 1980 Summer Olympics
Competitors at the 1973 Summer Universiade
Competitors at the 1977 Summer Universiade
Competitors at the 1978 Central American and Caribbean Games
20th-century Cuban people
21st-century Cuban people